Turkish towel can refer to two different things:

 a type of towel used in Turkish baths, such as a fouta towel or a peshtemal
 Chondracanthus exasperatus, a seaweed known as Turkish towel